Rachelle Aud Crowe (born 1972/1973) is the United States attorney for the Southern District of Illinois. She was previously a member of the Illinois Senate, representing the 56th district.

Education 

Crowe received a Bachelor of Arts from the University of Missouri–St. Louis in 1996 and a Juris Doctor from the Saint Louis University School of Law in 2000.

Career 

Crowe served as an associate with Hoagland, Fitzgerald, Smith & Praintis from 2000 to 2002, then Riezman Berger from 2002 to 2004 and Carmody MacDonald P.C. from 2004 to 2006. Crowe was previously a prosecutor with the Madison County State's Attorney's Office.

She defeated Downstate United and de facto Republican candidate Hal Patton, the mayor of Edwardsville, in the 2018 general election to succeed longtime Democratic incumbent Bill Haine. Crowe resigned from the Illinois Senate on June 15, 2022. In July 2022, Kristopher Tharp was appointed to succeed her.

U.S. attorney 
On April 22, 2022, President Joe Biden announced his intent to nominate Crowe to serve as the United States attorney for the Southern District of Illinois. On April 25, 2022, her nomination was sent to the Senate. On May 12, 2022, her nomination was reported out of committee by voice vote. On May 17, 2022, her nomination was confirmed in the Senate by voice vote. She was sworn in on June 21, 2022.

Electoral history

References

External links

Official profile at Illinois General Assembly official website
Rachelle for Senate official campaign site

1970s births
Living people
21st-century American women lawyers
21st-century American lawyers
21st-century American women politicians
21st-century American politicians
Year of birth missing (living people)
American prosecutors
Illinois lawyers
Democratic Party Illinois state senators
People from Glen Carbon, Illinois
People from Wood River, Illinois
Saint Louis University School of Law alumni
United States Attorneys for the Southern District of Illinois
University of Missouri–St. Louis alumni
Women state legislators in Illinois